The 2021 Canadian federal election was held on September 20, 2021, to elect members of the House of Commons to the 44th Canadian Parliament. The Liberal Party of Canada was returned once more with a minority of the seats, and the composition of the House saw very little change.

Summary

The election was described as being "like a game of tug of war in which the rope won." The remarkable similarity of the seat results and those in 2019 may have reinforced voters' sentiments that the early election was unnecessary, and its meagre outcome has left its mark on the electorate. Both the Liberals and Conservatives saw marginal declines in their national shares of the votes.

Tory holds in Western Canada, and Liberal ones in the GTA, were both weakened compared to 2019, although one Conservative observer noted, "I am far more encouraged by the narrowing of margins in the suburbs, than I am discouraged or concerned by an Alberta MP only winning by 30,000 votes".

The Green Party saw its share of the vote collapse to 2.3%, its lowest level since the 2000 federal election. Internal dissension and poor morale contributed to the decline, and Elizabeth May called for an inquiry to determine the underlying reasons for it. Paul announced her resignation as party leader on September 27, which took effect on November 14, after being officially accepted by the party's federal council.

In late November, the Greens released a report indicating that they were facing imminent insolvency, and were considering closing the Ottawa office. The party had lost 499 monthly donors since July 2021, and 6,259 members in the same length of time.

The increase of the People's Party share from 1.6% to 4.9% may have cost the Conservatives at least ten ridings. Votes obtained by individual PPC candidates were larger than the margin of victory in 21 ridings, where the Conservative candidate was in second place (12 in Ontario, five in BC, two in Alberta, one in Quebec and one in Newfoundland). Of those seats, 14 went to the Liberals, six to the NDP, and one to the Bloc. Observers noted that a significant amount of PPC support arose from non-Conservative voters.

Eight ridings were won by a margin of 1% or less, and judicial recounts were requested in four of them. One riding flipped from the Bloc to the Liberals, one Bloc victory was confirmed, and two proceedings were terminated when it became obvious that no change would occur.

Synopsis of results

Vote shares

Results analysis

Seats that changed hands

The following seats changed allegiance from the 2019 election.

Conservative to Liberal
Aurora—Oak Ridges—Richmond Hill
Calgary Skyview
Cloverdale—Langley City
Edmonton Centre
Markham—Unionville
Richmond Centre
Steveston—Richmond East

Conservative to NDP
Edmonton Griesbach
Port Moody—Coquitlam

Liberal to Conservative
Bay of Quinte
Coast of Bays—Central—Notre Dame
Cumberland—Colchester
King—Vaughan
Miramichi—Grand Lake
Peterborough—Kawartha
South Shore—St. Margarets

Liberal to Green
Kitchener Centre

NDP to Liberal
Hamilton Mountain
St. John's East

Green to Liberal
Fredericton

Green to NDP
Nanaimo—Ladysmith

Independent to Liberal
Vancouver Granville

Defeated MPs
Of the 22 seats that changed hands, four were open seats where the MPs chose to retire, and one was where the MP crossed the floor in June and was re-elected under a new banner; the other 17 went down to defeat.

Open seats that changed hands
Of the 31 seats open at dissolution, four were won by a non-incumbent party:

Disavowed candidates 
Below are the candidates who were disavowed by their parties and/or voluntarily ceased campaigning after candidate registration closed, remaining on the ballot with their original party affiliation.

MPs standing under a different political affiliation 
Jenica Atwin, who was elected as the Green Party candidate in Fredericton in 2019, switched party affiliation to the Liberal Party in June 2021, and was re-elected as a Liberal. Two MPs elected in 2019 contested the election but left their party affiliation blank when they registered; however, both failed to be re-elected.

Significant results among independent and minor party candidates
Those candidates not belonging to a major party, receiving more than 1,000 votes in the election, are listed below:

Results by province

Ontario

Quebec

British Columbia

Alberta

Post-election analysis

Elections Canada
Elections Canada reported the following general characteristics of voter turnout in the election, compared to 2019:

Together with Statistics Canada through its Labour Force Survey, analysis was undertaken in both 2019 and 2021 as to the reasons people gave for not voting:

From polling firms after Election Day

Per Ipsos

Notes and references

Notes

References

External links
 

 
Canadian federal election results